WDVM (1050 AM) is a radio station in Eau Claire, Wisconsin, United States. It is part of the Relevant Radio Christian network.

External links
Radio 1050 AM

DVM
Catholic radio stations
Relevant Radio stations